Antonio Montico (30 December 1933 – 27 May 2013) was an Italian professional football player and coach, who played as a midfielder.

Career
Montico played club football for Juventus F.C.In 1962, he played the remainder of the season in the Eastern Canada Professional Soccer League with Toronto Italia.

After he retired from playing, Montico became a football coach. He managed U.S. Pro Vercelli Calcio's youth and senior squads.

Honours
Juventus
 Serie A champion: 1957–58, 1959–60.
 Coppa Italia winner: 1958–59, 1959–60.

References

External links
 

1933 births
2013 deaths
People from the Province of Pordenone
Italian footballers
Italian expatriate footballers
Italy international footballers
Serie A players
Udinese Calcio players
Juventus F.C. players
S.S.C. Bari players
Toronto Italia players
A.C. Ancona players
Eastern Canada Professional Soccer League players
Italian football managers
Association football midfielders
A.S. Pro Gorizia players
Italian expatriate sportspeople in Canada
Expatriate soccer players in Canada
Footballers from Friuli Venezia Giulia